The "Dream Team" refers to the team of trial lawyers that represented O. J. Simpson in his 1995 trial for the murder of his former wife, Nicole Brown Simpson, and Ronald Goldman. The team included Robert Shapiro, Johnnie Cochran, Carl Douglas, Shawn Chapman, Gerald Uelmen, Robert Kardashian, Alan Dershowitz, F. Lee Bailey, Barry Scheck, Peter Neufeld, Robert Blasier,  and William Thompson.

The "Dream Team" lawyers

Robert Shapiro
Robert Shapiro joined Simpson's defense team one week after the beginning of the trial, when Howard Weitzman withdrew from the case stating his workload was too heavy to continue as chair. As defense chair, Shapiro was called the "architect" of the Simpson defense for building the high-profile legal team that would later be dubbed the "Dream Team." Shapiro led the defense team through much of the trial before Johnnie Cochran took over as the lead chair.
 
Shapiro is the co-founder of RightCounsel.com and is a senior partner in the Los Angeles-based law firm Glaser Weil Fink Jacobs Howard Avchen & Shapiro, LLP. He also co-founded LegalZoom.

Johnnie Cochran
Cochran joined the Simpson defense team and later took over as its chair, during the trial. In his closing arguments, Cochran famously uttered the phrase, "If it doesn't fit, you must acquit," referencing the prosecution's scenario not making sense in general, but also alluding to the fact that the glove the prosecutors alleged Simpson wore during the murder did not fit Simpson's hand.
 
Cochran was diagnosed with a brain tumor in December 2003 and subsequently died in his home in Los Angeles, on March 29, 2005.

Robert Kardashian
Robert Kardashian was a close friend of Simpson. Simpson stayed in Kardashian's house to avoid the media while the investigations and subsequent media fallout concerning the murders of Nicole Brown Simpson and Ronald Goldman unfolded. When Simpson failed to turn himself in on June 17, 1994, Kardashian read a letter written by Simpson to the media that had assembled outside of his house.
 
Kardashian ended up reactivating his license to practice law, which he had let lapse prior to the Simpson case, to join Simpson's defense team. After the case, he doubted Simpson's innocence, eventually severing ties with Simpson, stating that had he known his family would get death threats, he would have never taken the case.
 
Kardashian was diagnosed with esophageal cancer in July 2003. He died at the age of 59 on September 30, 2003.

F. Lee Bailey
F. Lee Bailey joined the defense team before the preliminary hearing and handled many of the defense team's press conferences. Bailey's most notable contribution to the defense was his cross-examination of LAPD investigator Mark Fuhrman.

In a press conference leading up to his cross-examination of Fuhrman, Bailey said, "any lawyer in his right mind who would not be looking forward to cross-examining Mark Fuhrman is an idiot." During the cross-examination, Bailey was able to get Fuhrman to plead the Fifth in response to key aspects of the case, including planting evidence, thereby undermining Fuhrman's credibility as a witness. This cross-examination is believed by many to be one of the keys to Simpson's acquittal.

Bailey died on June 3, 2021 at the age of 87.

Alan Dershowitz
Alan Dershowitz was the Felix Frankfurter professor emeritus at Harvard Law School and  remained one of the most successful lawyers and legal scholars in the country.

After representing Simpson, he has represented Julian Assange, Jeffrey Epstein and Harvey Weinstein. He has also served as a member of the legal team for President Donald Trump during his first impeachment trial.

Dershowitz has written multiple books about law and politics including Reasonable Doubts: The Criminal Justice System and the O. J. Simpson Case and The Case for Peace.

Barry Scheck
Barry Scheck, a law professor at the Benjamin N. Cardozo School of Law in New York City, is a forensic expert.
 
Scheck is also known for his work as co-founder and co-director of the Innocence Project, a non-profit organization that uses DNA evidence to clear the names of wrongfully convicted inmates.

Peter Neufeld
Peter Neufeld joined the Simpson defense team to assist with undermining the prosecution's DNA and forensic evidence. He is perhaps best known for discrediting the credibility of the blood trail between Nicole Brown Simpson's body and O. J. Simpson's car.

Neufeld is a co-founder of the Innocence Project, along with fellow "Dream Team" member Barry Scheck. Neufeld is currently a partner at Neufeld Scheck & Brustin, LLP in New York.

Gerald F. Uelmen
Gerald Uelmen was part of O. J. Simpson's defense team during the O. J. Simpson murder case. Uelmen says he devised the memorable line used by Johnnie Cochran in the closing argument, "If it doesn't fit, you must acquit." Uelmen is currently a professor at the Santa Clara University School of Law, where he served as Dean from 1986 to 1994. He served as defense counsel in the trials of Daniel Ellsberg and Christian Brando.  In 2006, he was appointed Executive Director for the California Commission on the Fair Administration of Justice, created by the California State Senate to examine the causes of wrongful convictions and propose reforms of the California criminal justice system.

Robert Blasier
Blasier was a student of Dershowitz, and was also counsel for Simpson's civil trial.

Carl E. Douglas
Carl Douglas was widely considered one of Johnnie Cochran's top lawyers.  He later became the managing attorney of the Law Office of Johnnie Cochran, Jr. before leaving the firm in 1998, to form The Douglas Law Group (now known as Douglas / Hicks Law).

Shawn Holley
Shawn Holley also worked for Cochran, and is a partner at Kinsella Weitzman Iser Kump Holley LLP, a boutique firm in Santa Monica.

Verdict
On October 3, 1995, at 10:00 a.m, after four hours of deliberation, the jury found Simpson not guilty on both murder counts. News of the verdict had a disruptive effect in the United States and abroad, as an estimated 100 million people worldwide watched or listened to the verdict announcement.
 
Before the verdict was read, President Bill Clinton was briefed on potential security measures, in case rioting occurred following the announcement. The Supreme Court of the United States received a note documenting the verdict, which  the justices passed to each other while listening to the  oral arguments of the case at hand.

Portrayal in film and television
The Dream Team's success has been portrayed in multiple documentaries and docudramas.
 
In 1995, Fox premiered the TV movie The O. J. Simpson Story.
In 2000, 20th Century Fox produced An American Tragedy, with Ving Rhames as Johnnie Cochran, Christopher Plummer as F. Lee Bailey, Ron Silver as Robert Shapiro, Robert LuPone as Robert Kardashian, Richard Cox as Alan Dershowitz, Bruno Kirby as Barry Scheck, Nicholas Pryor as Gerald Uelmen, and Raymond Forchion as O. J. Simpson. Coincidentally, Silver previously portrayed Alan Dershowitz in Reversal of Fortune.
On February 2, 2016, FX premiered the first season of the anthology series, American Crime Story, titled, The People v. O.J. Simpson: American Crime Story. The Dream Team was portrayed by Courtney B. Vance (Cochran), John Travolta (Shapiro), Nathan Lane (Bailey), Evan Handler (Dershowitz), David Schwimmer (Kardashian), and Rob Morrow (Scheck).
In June 2016, ESPN premiered O.J.: Made in America, a 5-part, 8-hour documentary on the trial, by Ezra Edelman.

References 

American lawyers
O. J. Simpson murder case
Alan Dershowitz